Stade Emile Albeau was a multi-use stadium in Sedan, France. It was initially used as the stadium of CS Sedan Ardennes matches.  It was replaced by the current Stade Louis Dugauguez in 2000.  The capacity of the stadium was 17,000 spectators.

External links
Stadium history

CS Sedan Ardennes
Emile Albeau
Sports venues in Ardennes (department)